Forsteronia portoricensis is a species of flowering plant in the genus Forsteronia of the family Apocynaceae. It is endemic to Puerto Rico, and typically grows in moist regions of woods, thickets, or forests. It can reach a maximum length of 7 metres, and produces a large quantity of red flowers.

References

portoricensis
Endemic flora of Puerto Rico
Plants described in 1934